Sisurcana microbaccata is a species of moth of the family Tortricidae. It is found in Carchi Province, Ecuador.

The wingspan is about 20 mm. The ground colour of the forewings is cream brown with brown suffusions, costal spots, base and terminal area. The hindwings are pale greyish brown.

Etymology
The species name refers to the refractive dots on the forewing and is derived from Greek micros (meaning small) and baccatus (meaning covered with pearls).

References

Moths described in 2009
Sisurcana
Moths of South America
Taxa named by Józef Razowski